Botswana Railways (BR) is the national railway of Botswana.

History

Botswana Railways (BR)  was established in 1987 when the government of Botswana bought out the Botswana-based sections of the National Railways of Zimbabwe (NRZ). NRZ had been initially operating the rail system after Botswana had gained independence.
Management of the BR is supported by RITES Ltd. of India.

The opening of the Beitbridge Bulawayo Railway in Zimbabwe in 1999 resulted in a major drop in the volume of freight transit and income. As a response the BR has been considering the construction of a direct line to Zambia (Zambia Railways), bypassing Zimbabwe, to regain income from transit.

On 27 February 2009, an announcement was made of the termination of all Botswana Railways passenger services. However, passenger trains run by National Railways of Zimbabwe (NRZ) continue to run from Bulawayo to Lobatse via Plumtree, Francistown and Gaborone.

As of October 2010, BR was building a large shopping mall near Gaborone station, and expressed hopes that passenger services might resume, although BR could not give any concrete details.

In December 2014 Botswana Railways announced that they will purchase new passenger cars and locomotives and that passenger services would resume in late 2015. A passenger service between Gaborone and Lobatse, marketed under the name BR Express, eventually began operation in March 2016.

Network

The main line runs through the south-eastern region of Botswana from Mahikeng in South Africa through Lobatse, Gaborone, Mahalapye, Palapye and Francistown to Plumtree in Zimbabwe. In addition there are three branch lines: from Palapye to Morupule Colliery, from Serole to Selebi-Phikwe, and from Francistown to Sowa.
Main Line - 640 km
Francistown to Sua Pan (branch line) - 174.5 km
Palapye to Morupule Colliery (branch line) - 16 km
Private Sidings - 50 km
Service Sidings - 20 km
Station Yards - 30 km
Crossing Loops - 20 km

Fleet

Locomotives

As of December 2017

8 General Electric UM 22C diesel-electric locomotives, 1982
20 General Motors Model GT22LC-2 diesel electric locomotives, 1986
10 General Electric U15C diesel electric locomotives, 1990
 8 General Motors Model (GT42AC) diesel electric, 2017

Purchase of passenger cars and locomotives
In December 2014 Botswana Railways announced that they would purchase three generator vans, five first class sleepers, 18 economy class coaches, five business class coaches, three buffet cars and a luggage van.

Regional train

Botswana Railways run 2 nightly passenger trains, one from Lobatse to Francistown, and the other from Francistown to Lobatse, with stops in Gaborone, Mahalapye, Palapye, and Serule. The passenger train is termed the "BR Express".

Commuter train
BR Express operates a commuter train system between Lobatse and Gaborone. The train departs from Lobatse at 05:30 and arrives at Gaborone in 06:49. The train returns to Lobatse in the evening, departing from Gaborone at 18:00 and arriving at Lobatse at 19:34.

The train stops at Otse, Ramotswa and Commerce Park Halt.

Railway links to adjacent countries 
Botswana Railways are connected to Zimbabwe and
South African lines, both using the same gauge.

There is no direct connection with Namibia, but one does exist via South Africa, although an electrified railway connecting to Lüderitz in Namibia for coal traffic was scheduled to open in 2006.

In August 2010, Mozambique and Botswana signed a memorandum of understanding to develop an 1100 km railway through Zimbabwe, to carry coal from Serule in Botswana to a deep-water port at Techobanine Point in Mozambique.

A new rail link between Botswana and Zambia, bypassing Zimbabwe, was mooted in 2005 by Botswana Railways (BR) general manager Andrew Lunga. The line was envisaged as running south-westwards from Livingstone, crossing the Zambezi, then continuing to a junction with the existing BR tracks at Mosetse. Lunga's proposal arose following the serious loss of traffic suffered by BR following the opening of the Beitbridge-Bulawayo line, after which annual BR freight tonnage fell from 1.1m per annum to about 150,000. Zimbabwe's economic problems had worsened the situation, prejudicing free traffic flow. The suggested line, Lunga pointed out, would provide important alternative routes linking South Africa, Zambia and the Democratic Republic of Congo.

Gallery of Botswana Rail

See also 
 Transport in Botswana

References

External links
Botswana Railways

Railway companies of Botswana
3 ft 6 in gauge railways in Botswana
Botswana companies